MatriKiran School is an ICSE-affiliated, English medium co-educational school for grades pre-nursery to 12, located in Gurgaon in Haryana, India. The 8.25-acre campus is spread over two locations. The Junior School (to Grade 5) opened on 4 April 2011, whereas the High School commenced on 4 April 2016. It is managed by the Auro Education Society, the educational arm of the Vatika Group.

Location 
The educational center has two branches. The Junior School, on Sohna Road, covers 2 acres. The Senior School, Sector 83, encompasses 6.25 acres. Pre-nursery to grade 5 students attend the Junior School, and grades 6 to 12 study at the High School.

Academics 
The school provides education up to the 10+2 level (ICSE and ISC).

MatriKiran follows the learning strategy of project-based study. The integrated curriculum gradually advances in degrees of specialisation at each level.

See also 

 List of schools in Gurgaon

References

External links 
 , the school's official website
 Some images of the school

Schools in Gurgaon